Augustus Hoppin (1828–1896) was an American book illustrator, born in Providence, R. I.  He graduated at Brown University in 1848 and was admitted to the bar, but soon gave up the law and went abroad to study art.  Upon his return he devoted himself to drawing on wood and to the illustration of books, in which he was successful.  His pictures in Nothing to Wear (1857), Poliphar Papers (1853), and The Autocrat of the Breakfast-Table (1858) are widely known.  He published several volumes of sketches and novels, among the latter Recollections of Auton House (1881) and Married for Fun (1885).

References

External links
 
 
 

19th-century American novelists
Artists from Providence, Rhode Island
American illustrators
1828 births
1896 deaths
American male novelists
19th-century American male writers
Writers from Providence, Rhode Island